Afripupa rodriguezensis is a species of very small, air-breathing land snail, a terrestrial pulmonate gastropod mollusc in the family Vertiginidae, the whorl snails. 

This species is endemic to Mauritius.

References

 Connolly, M. (1925). Notes on a collection of non-marine Mollusca from the islands of the Indian Ocean. Journal of Conchology, 17 (9): 257-266. London

Vertiginidae
Gastropods described in 1925
Endemic fauna of Mauritius